The 54th parallel south is a circle of latitude that is 54 degrees south of the Earth's equatorial plane. It crosses the Atlantic Ocean, the Indian Ocean, the Pacific Ocean and South America.

At this latitude the sun is visible for 17 hours, 09 minutes during the December solstice and 7 hours, 22 minutes during the June solstice.

Around the world
Starting at the Prime Meridian and heading eastwards, the parallel 54° south passes through:

{| class="wikitable plainrowheaders"
! scope="col" width="125" | Co-ordinates
! scope="col" | Country, territory or ocean
! scope="col" | Notes
|-
| style="background:#b0e0e6;" | 
! scope="row" style="background:#b0e0e6;" | Atlantic Ocean
| style="background:#b0e0e6;" | Passing north of Bouvet Island, 
|-
| style="background:#b0e0e6;" | 
! scope="row" style="background:#b0e0e6;" | Indian Ocean
| style="background:#b0e0e6;" | Passing just north of Macquarie Island, 
|-
| style="background:#b0e0e6;" | 
! scope="row" style="background:#b0e0e6;" | Pacific Ocean
| style="background:#b0e0e6;" |
|-
| 
! scope="row" | 
| Santa Inés Island, Clarence Island and Aracena Island, Magallanes Region
|-
| style="background:#b0e0e6;" | 
! scope="row" style="background:#b0e0e6;" | Pacific Ocean
| style="background:#b0e0e6;" | Strait of Magellan
|-
| 
! scope="row" | 
| Dawson Island, Magallanes Region
|-
| style="background:#b0e0e6;" | 
! scope="row" style="background:#b0e0e6;" | Pacific Ocean
| style="background:#b0e0e6;" | Canal Whiteside
|-
| 
! scope="row" | 
| Isla Grande de Tierra del Fuego, Magallanes Region
|-
| 
! scope="row" | 
| Isla Grande de Tierra del Fuego, Tierra del Fuego Province
|-
| style="background:#b0e0e6;" | 
! scope="row" style="background:#b0e0e6;" | Atlantic Ocean
| style="background:#b0e0e6;" |
|-valign="top"
| 
! scope="row" | 
| Willis Islands, Bird Island and South Georgia  
|-
| style="background:#b0e0e6;" | 
! scope="row" style="background:#b0e0e6;" | Atlantic Ocean
| style="background:#b0e0e6;" |
|}

See also 
53rd parallel south
55th parallel south

References

s54